Lippe I is an electoral constituency (German: Wahlkreis) represented in the Bundestag. It elects one member via first-past-the-post voting. Under the current constituency numbering system, it is designated as constituency 135. It is located in eastern North Rhine-Westphalia, comprising the northern part of the Lippe district.

Lippe I was created for the 1980 federal election. Since 2021, it has been represented by Jürgen Berghahn of the Social Democratic Party (SPD).

Geography
Lippe I is located in eastern North Rhine-Westphalia. As of the 2021 federal election, it comprises the entirety of the Lippe district excluding the municipalities of Augustdorf, Horn-Bad Meinberg, Lügde, Schieder-Schwalenberg, and Schlangen.

History
Lippe I was created in 1980 and contained parts of the abolished constituency of Detmold – Lippe. In the 1980 through 1998 elections, it was constituency 105 in the numbering system. From 2002 through 2009, it was number 136. Since 2013, it has been number 135. Ahead of the 2021 election, the constituency acquired the municipality of Detmold.

Members
The constituency was first represented by Erhard Mahne of the Social Democratic Party (SPD) from 1980 to 1983, when it was won by Klaus Daweke of the CDU for a single term. Karl Hermann Haack of the SPD was elected in 1987 and served until 2005. Fellow party member Dirk Becker was then representative for three terms. Kerstin Vieregge of the CDU was elected in 2017. Jürgen Berghahn regained the constituency for the SPD in 2021.

Election results

2021 election

2017 election

2013 election

2009 election

References

Federal electoral districts in North Rhine-Westphalia
1980 establishments in West Germany
Constituencies established in 1980
Lippe